Suthida Bajrasudhabimalalakshana, born Suthida Tidjai (3 June 1978), is Queen of Thailand as the fourth wife of King Vajiralongkorn. Before their marriage, she was a flight attendant. After joining the Thai military, she was promoted to King’s bodyguard.

Early life and education
Suthida was born on 3 June 1978 to the Tidjai family, Kham (father) and Jangheang (mother). She is ethnically Hokkien, coming from a Thai Chinese family. She graduated from Hatyaiwittayalai Somboonkulkanya Middle School and Assumption University with a bachelor's degree in communication arts in 2000. Suthida was formerly a flight attendant for JALways – a Japan Airlines' subsidiary – from 2000 to 2003 and later Thai Airways International in 2003 until 2008.

Crown Prince's guard
Suthida was appointed commander of Crown Prince Vajiralongkorn's household guard in August 2014. As early as 2010, Suthida was linked romantically to the crown prince, who was then still married to Srirasmi Suwadee. In October 2016, international media reports labeled her as the designated king's "consort", despite the palace never officially declaring their relationship.

On 13 October 2017, she was named a Dame Grand Cross (First Class) of The Most Illustrious Order of Chula Chom Klao, which bestows the title Than Phu Ying. She is the first female officer to receive this honour since 2004 and the first in the reign of King Rama X.

Royal Thai Army service
On 1 December 2016, she was appointed Commander of the Special Operations Unit of the King's Guard and promoted to the rank of general. She reached her present rank after only six years of service. She has successfully completed several military training courses.

On 1 June 2017, she was appointed as acting commander of Royal Thai Aide-de-camp Department following the reorganization of the Royal Security Command.

Queen consort

On 1 May 2019, Suthida was made Queen of Thailand of King Vajiralongkorn whose coronation took place in Bangkok on 4–6 May 2019. The marriage registration took place at the Amphorn Sathan Residential Hall in Bangkok, with her sister-in-law Princess Sirindhorn and President of Privy Council Prem Tinsulanonda as witnesses.

Title, styles, honours and awards

 Since 4 May 2019: Her Majesty Queen Suthida Bajarasudha Bimollaksana (สมเด็จพระนางเจ้าสุทิดา พัชรสุธาพิมลลักษณ พระบรมราชินี)

Honours
  Dame of The Most Illustrious Order of the Royal House of Chakri
  Dame of The Ancient and Auspicious Order of the Nine Gems
  Dame Grand Cross (First Class) of The Most Illustrious Order of Chula Chom Klao
  Dame Grand Cordon (Special Class) of The Most Exalted Order of the White Elephant
  Dame Grand Cordon (Special Class) of The Most Noble Order of the Crown of Thailand
  Royal Cypher Medal of King Rama IX
  Royal Cypher Medal of King Rama X
  Commemorative Medal on the Occasion of the 60th Birthday Anniversary of H.R.H. Prince Maha Vajiralongkorn
  Commemorative Medal on the Occasion of the Coronation of H.M. King Rama X

Military ranks
  14 May 2010: Second Lieutenant
  14 November 2010: First Lieutenant
  1 April 2011: Captain
  1 October 2011: Major
  1 April 2012: Lieutenant Colonel
  1 October 2012: Colonel
  10 November 2013: Major-General
  26 August 2016: Lieutenant-General
  10 December 2016: General

References

21st-century Thai women
21st-century Chakri dynasty
Living people
People from Songkhla province
Thai queens consort
Royal Thai Army generals
Consorts of Vajiralongkorn
Mahidol family
Assumption University (Thailand) alumni
Thai people of Chinese descent
1978 births

Suthida Vajiralongkorn
Flight attendants